The following are the national records in track cycling in Germany maintained by the Germany's national cycling federation: Bund Deutscher Radfahrer (BDR).

Men
Key to tables:

Women

References
General
 German Track Cycling Records 14 June 2022 updated
Specific

External links
 BDR web site

German
Records
Track cycling
Track cycling